Queen's Wood is a 52-acre (21 hectare) area of ancient woodland in the London Borough of Haringey, abutting Highgate Wood and lying between East Finchley, Highgate, Muswell Hill and Crouch End. It was originally part of the ancient Forest of Middlesex which covered much of London, Hertfordshire and Essex and was mentioned in the Domesday Book. It is now one of three Local Nature Reserves in the London Borough of Haringey. It is situated a few minutes' walk from Highgate tube station.

Haringey contains four ancient woods. These are Highgate Wood, Queen's Wood, Coldfall Wood and Bluebell Wood. All are shown on John Rocque's 1754 Map of Middlesex.

Queen's Wood was once called Churchyard Bottom Wood, and was originally part of the Great Forest of Middlesex. It was said to be the site of a plague pit during the Great Plague of London, although evidence suggests if there was a plague pit it was just outside the boundaries of the current wood. In 1898 it was purchased from the Ecclesiastical Commissioners by Hornsey Urban District Council, opened to the public by Princess Helena, Duchess of Albany, and renamed Queen's Wood in honour of Queen Victoria.

The wood is an ancient oak-hornbeam woodland, which features English oak and occasional beech which provide a canopy above cherry, field maple, hazel, holly, hornbeam, midland hawthorn, mountain ash and both species of lowland birch. The scarce Wild Service Tree (which is evidence of the Woods's ancient origin) is scattered throughout the wood. The Wood has a small adventure playground, but no park or playing fields, and has never been subjected to intensive management of the type practised at Highgate Wood and accordingly there is greater diversity of flora and fauna - Bantock (1984) found a significantly greater number of ground feeding birds present in the Wood when compared to Highgate Wood, which he attributed to the greater structural diversity and denser shrub layer present. Queen's Wood is a Local Nature Reserve and a Site of Metropolitan Importance for Nature Conservation.

The ground flora is particularly rich given its proximity to central London (the wood is within a six-mile radius of Charing Cross railway station). It includes a large population of wood anemone, goldilocks buttercup and wood sorrel, yellow pimpernel and square-stemmed St John's wort. A survey conducted in 1984 noted 39 distinct herbaceous species and 15 different grasses native to the wood, in addition to some 23 species of tree and shrub.

A small paddling pool which had fallen into disuse has been converted into a pond with wild aquatic plants. This was with the assistance of the Friends of Queens Wood society.

Despite fairly high levels of disturbance, the bird life is diverse and includes breeding pairs of at least 27 species, including the endangered song thrush and two species of woodpecker. Over one hundred species of spiders have been spotted and a nationally rare jewel beetle is widespread.

The park is also the source of the Moselle, a stream that runs across parts of North London on its way (nowadays via Pymmes Brook) to the River Lea in Tottenham.

References

External links
Friends of Queen's Wood
Haringey Council Site
Queens Wood on the VisitWoods website

Ancient woods of London
Local nature reserves in Greater London
Nature reserves in the London Borough of Haringey
Parks and open spaces in the London Borough of Haringey